Martin Schiele (17 January 1870 – 16 February 1939) was a German nationalist politician. He was part of the leadership of the German National People's Party (DNVP) from its 1918 founding until Alfred Hugenberg became leader in 1928. He was also the chief representative of the agrarian wing of the DNVP. As a member of Hans Luther's coalition government, Schiele secured the restoration of agricultural and industrial protectionism with the tariff of 1925. As minister of food in 1927–28, he favored state credit as a means for subsidising agriculture.

He was persuaded by President Hindenburg to return as minister of food in Heinrich Brüning's cabinet. The Agricultural League under Schiele's leadership was criticised by Richard Walther Darré's Nazi agrarian apparatus. Schiele ceased to be leader of the Agricultural League shortly after the 1930 election. Unhappy with Hugenberg's leadership, Schiele left the DNVP and moved closer to the Conservative People's Party.

References

External links
 

1870 births
1939 deaths
People from Stendal (district)
People from the Province of Saxony
German Protestants
German Conservative Party politicians
German National People's Party politicians
Christian-National Peasants' and Farmers' Party politicians
Interior ministers of Germany
Members of the 13th Reichstag of the German Empire
Members of the Weimar National Assembly
Members of the Reichstag of the Weimar Republic